The Dodge Monaco is an automobile that was marketed by the Dodge division of Chrysler Corporation. Introduced as the flagship of the Dodge product line, the Monaco was introduced for 1965 to replace the Custom 880, later then later joining as a sub-model of the Dodge Polara. During its production, the Monaco was offered in multiple body configurations, including two-door and four-door hardtop sedans, four-door sedans, two-door convertibles, and station wagons.

From 1965 to 1977, three generations of the Monaco were produced with the full-size Chrysler C platform. For 1977 and 1978, Dodge shifted the Monaco to the intermediate Chrysler B platform, effectively downsizing the model line. For 1979, the model line was redesigned and renamed the Dodge St. Regis.

After a 12-year hiatus, the full-size Monaco was revived for 1990 as the flagship Dodge sedan, replacing the Diplomat. A rebadged version of the AMC-developed Eagle Premier, the Monaco was replaced by the Dodge Intrepid for 1993.

It is named after the Principality of Monaco.

First generation (1965–1968)

1965
Upon its introduction on September 25, 1964, for the 1965 model year, the Dodge Monaco was intended to compete with the Pontiac Grand Prix in what came to be known as the personal luxury market, but ended up filling in for Dodge in the full-size, luxury line instead.

The 1965 Monaco was based on the Custom 880 two-door hardtop body. The Monaco received special badging, different taillight and grille treatment, and a sportier interior with a full-length center console, as well as a   V8 engine as standard equipment. Larger, more powerful engines were also available as options. The Monaco competed with the Ford LTD, a top-of-the-line model in the Galaxie 500 series, the Caprice package for the Impala Sport sedan, as well as the 1966 Plymouth VIP model for its Fury series and the Ambassador DPL offered by American Motors. These models provided competition for mid-priced sedans like Chrysler, Oldsmobile, Buick, and Mercury.

In Canada, a version of the Plymouth Sport Fury was marketed as the Dodge Monaco. It was available in hardtop coupe or convertible body styles. The Canadian Monacos were equipped with Plymouth dashboards in 1965 and 1966. Unlike the U.S. Monaco versions, the Canadian Monacos were available with  V8s or the slant six.

1966
For 1966, in the U.S., the Monaco replaced the Custom 880 series and the former Monaco became the Monaco 500. The basic Monaco was available in hardtop coupe, four-door (pillarless) hardtop sedan, conventional four-door (pillared) sedan, and four-door station wagon bodystyles. In the U.S., the Monaco 500 was available only as a hardtop coupe. Although there was no convertible in the 1966 U.S. Monaco range, there was in the 1966 Canadian Monaco lineup. The Canadian Dodge hung onto the "Monaco" name for the Sport Fury equivalent and Polara 880 for the Fury III competitor.

1967
For 1967, all full-sized Dodges, the Monaco included, received significant facelifts with all-new exterior sheet metal. Chief designer Elwood Engel's work featured generally flat body planes with sharp-edged accent lines. The hardtop coupes got new semi-fastback rooflines with reverse-slanted trailing edges on the rear quarter windows.

In Canada, the "Monaco" name was applied for 1967 to all of the premium full-sized Dodge cars, replacing the Polara 880 at the top of the Dodge line. Taking the Monaco's place as a premium full-size model was the Monaco 500, which was available only as a two-door hardtop and convertible.

1968
Marker lights in the fenders and full width tail lights were added. The Monaco 500 was dropped at the end of the 1968 model year in the United States and at the end of the 1970 model year in Canada.

Second generation (1969–1973)

1969

For the 1969 model year, the wheelbase of the Monaco was increased from 121 inches to 122 inches, and the length was increased to about 220 inches. Returning for 1969 was the "500" option, which in the U.S. market gave the Monaco front bucket seats and a center armrest. In Canada, the Monaco 500 was a separate series that used the side trim of the Polara 500 sold in the U.S. Canadians could also buy a Monaco convertible; U.S. Dodge full-size convertible shoppers had only the lower-end Polara and Polara 500 to choose from.

All full-sized Dodge cars including the Monaco adopted Chrysler Corporation's new "fuselage" styling, in which the upper and lower body are melded into a uniformly curved unit. Curved side glass adds to the effect, as does the deletion of the "shoulder" along the rear. The look starts in the front of the car, with a nearly straight-across bumper—demanded by a Chrysler executive after a Congressional committee attacked him over the seeming inability of car bumpers to protect cars from extensive damage in low-speed collisions—and a five-segment eggcrate grille that surrounds the headlamps. When the cars failed to spark buyers' interest, Dodge executives demanded a change. By the summer of 1969, the division released new chrome trim for the front fender caps and leading edge of the hood as an option, which gives the appearance of a then-fashionable loop bumper without the tooling expense. At the rear, Dodge's signature delta-shaped taillamps were presented in a new form that required the top of the bumper to slope downward toward each end.

The standard-equipment engine on the 1969 Monaco is Chrysler's  B-block  V8 engine with a two-barrel 2245 Holley carburetor. Wagon buyers choosing the 440 got a  version.

The 1969 Monaco offered, as a $50 option, the first modern polyellipsoidal (projector) automotive road lamp. Called "Super-Lite" and mounted in the driver's side of the grille, this auxiliary headlamp was produced in a joint venture between Chrysler Corporation and Sylvania. It uses an 85-watt halogen bulb and was intended as a mid-beam, to extend the reach of the low beams during turnpike travel when low beams alone were inadequate but high beams would produce excessive glare to oncoming drivers.

Available models for 1969 included a two-door hardtop coupe, four-door hardtop sedan, four-door pillared sedan, and four-door station wagons with six- or nine-passenger capacity. A new Brougham option package included a vinyl roof on sedans and hardtops and a split-bench front seat with a reclining mechanism on the passenger side (except on the two-door hardtops). Monaco wagons received wood-grained vinyl trim along their sides and across the dual-action (side- and bottom-hinged) tailgate.

Sales of the Polara and Monaco were down by nearly 20,000 cars compared with 1968, with the Monaco line accounting for 38,566 of the 127,252 full-size cars made by Dodge for the year.

1970

The 1970 models got completely new front and rear styling that included expensive-to-make loop bumpers front and rear. In the front, the new bumper enclosed a new diecast grille and the headlamps. At the rear, the double-loop bumper enclosed the taillamps. Reversing lamps were moved up into the endcaps that terminated the quarter panels, in slotted body-color housings. The designers chose to emphasize the length of the hood this year, which meant that the redesigned front end grew by three inches. However, the new rear end was four inches (102 mm) shorter. 

Improvements to the suspension were promoted as the new "Torsion-Quiet" system, which used strategically placed rubber isolators to reduce road noise and vibrations. The rear wheel track was broadened by nearly three inches as Dodge installed the rear axle that had been used only on Wagons on all 1970 Monaco models.

The Brougham and 500 option packages continued, as did the availability of the Super-Lite, but the 440 Magnum V8 was dropped. The  version 440, available only in wagons for 1969, became the new top engine for all Monacos. Despite all of the changes, which cost Chrysler a rather large sum of money, Monaco (and Polara) sales declined with 24,692 Monacos built for the model year.

1971

The 1971 Monaco received a facelift featuring a new grille within the bumper that had been used the previous year, and other minor styling changes that were focused mainly at the rear. The Super-Lite was no longer available because of a lack of consumer interest and challenges to its legality in some states. A new single-loop rear bumper and larger taillamps were installed.

The 500 option package was deleted although a stereo cassette player-recorder with microphone was new on the option list. Bucket seats remained available despite the loss of the 500 package, and the Brougham package was also still available for $220, despite the addition of a separate Polara Brougham series.

All engines had their compression ratio reduced so they could all run satisfactorily on regular-grade gasoline.

Monaco station wagons, which in 1969 and 1970 had worn their woodgrain trim on the lower bodysides, got completely new woodgrain up high on the sides, even around the windows. The new vinyl decals were translucent, allowing some of the paint color to show through.

Despite the power losses and mild styling change, sales slightly rose. About 900 more Monacos were built for 1971 (approximately 25,544 — an exact number is not known).

1972

For the 1972 model year, the full-sized Dodges finally got the all-new sheetmetal that had originally been planned for 1971.

Setting off the new look for the Monaco was a new front end with hidden headlamps set above a completely new bumper-grille assembly. The sides of the car lost their previous plump appearance in favor of a new, lean look with a new feature line that started on the front fenders and ran back through the doors, kicking up ahead of the rear wheels. Sedan and hardtop rooflines were new and more formal-looking. At the rear, there was yet another new loop bumper and full-width taillamp which, like the rest of the car, looked much more expensive and impressive. Station wagons received a new rear appearance with "stacked" vertical taillamps.

The Monaco got a smaller standard V8 for 1972. The  LA-block V8 engine, which had been introduced in 1971 as an option on Polaras, developed , now measured as net instead of gross. Still the 400 was a new created V8 B engine  B-block V8. The 440 remained available, but it now produced  (net). 1972 sales nearly matched 1969 levels, with 37,013 built for the model year.

1973

For its last year in the fuselage body, the Monaco continued with its 1972 styling, except for another new rear bumper with redesigned taillamps, along with a new decklid and rear-quarter endcaps. Large black rubber guards were added to the bumpers to comply with new Federal five-mile-per-hour impact standards. Hardtop and sedan models gained about  due mostly to the bumper guards.

Inside, new fire-retardant materials in virtually every visible part of the interior meant added safety. Under the hood, all three available engines gained reliability with the addition of Chrysler's new electronic ignition system as standard equipment, which extended spark plug life and virtually eliminated periodic ignition system maintenance.

Despite the cars' improvements, sales dropped again to 29,396.

1973 proved to be the Monaco's final year as Dodge's top-of-the-line full-size car. After 14 years, the Polara name was dropped and, for 1974, all big Dodges carried the Monaco name.

South Africa
In July 1969, Chrysler South Africa introduced a rebadged locally built version of the Dodge Monaco as the Chrysler 383. This badge remained in use for about four years, being dropped in early 1973. This was the first time that they had used the "Chrysler" badge on a locally built product in ten years. It was also one of the biggest cars built there, and had the biggest engine as well. The 383 ci V8 offered , and the fully equipped car featured power windows and a standard vinyl roof.

Third generation (1974–1977)

1974
The full-size C-body 1974 Dodge Monaco was completely redesigned for the 1974 model year with an all-new unibody platform and all-new sheet metal. However, within days of their introduction, the 1973 oil crisis began. Chrysler was excoriated in the media for bringing out huge new cars, and sales suffered accordingly. Many in the automotive press also criticized the car's new design as being too derivative of what they thought resembled a 3-year-old Buick or Oldsmobile full-size car. The Dodge Polara and Polara Custom models were discontinued after the 1973 model year. The Monaco and Monaco Custom replaced them respectively. The previous Monaco was renamed Monaco Brougham. The Brougham name had was used on a luxury option package from 1969 to 1973. The hidden headlamps of the previous models were replaced by fixed headlamps on all Monacos.

1975
For the 1975 model year, changes to the base Monaco were minimal. However, the Monaco Custom was renamed the Royal Monaco, and the Monaco Brougham became the Royal Monaco Brougham. These newly named models featured hidden headlamps. 1975 was the last model year in which the four-door hardtop was available. Some models, depending on equipment and the state they were sold in, received catalytic converters to comply with increasingly strict vehicle emissions control regulations. After the start of the 1975 model year, a limited-production option for Royal Monaco Brougham coupes was introduced: the Diplomat package featured a landau vinyl roof with opera windows and a wide steel roof band. It was available in only three colors—Cold Metallic, Silver Cloud Metallic and Maroon Metallic. The car weighed over two tons with a top speed of 127 mph.

1976
At the start of the 1976 model year, exterior changes on the full-size C-body 1976 Dodge Monaco were very minimal, though all models (including police packages) now had the former high-series front panel with hidden headlights. Chrysler's new Lean Burn system was introduced in order to reduce exhaust emissions (only on the 400 cubic inch engine). The four-door hardtop, which had been part of the Dodge Monaco line up during the previous ten model years (from 1966 to 1968, from 1969 to 1973 and from 1974 to 1975) ever since the Dodge Monaco made its debut from eleven model years earlier (1965), had been discontinued during the end of the previous model year (1975), which reduced the choice of body styles to just three offerings, the four-door wagon, four-door sedan, and two-door hardtop for the 1976 model year. The  with a four-barrel carburetor could still be ordered.

1977 (Royal Monaco)
For the 1977 model year, the Monaco was effectively split into two model lines, with the Royal Monaco retaining the full-size C-platform alongside the Chrysler New Yorker, with the standard Monaco replacing the Coronet B-platform intermediate. Offered in standard and Brougham trims, the Royal Monaco was produced as a two-door hardtop sedan, four-door sedan, and five-door station wagon.

For the first time, the 318 cubic-inch V8 was used as the standard engine. Outside of California, the 360 V8 (with a two-barrel carburetor) and the 400 V8 remained available; the 440 V8 was offered as an option. A 3-speed automatic was the only transmission available.

The Royal Monaco was retired for 1978, as Chrysler offered the C-platform only through its namesake division.

Fourth generation (1977–1978)

1977 
The 1977 model year brought changes to the Dodge Monaco line up as a lingering result of the 1973–1974 energy crisis, especially as Chrysler decided to move the Dodge Monaco, in name form only, from the full-size C platform-body to the mid-size B platform-body line up for the 1977 model year. The entire 1977 Dodge Monaco line up received a make-over. The previous model year's full-size C-body Dodge Monaco (from 1976) became, just for one year only, the full-size C-body 1977 Dodge Royal Monaco until its discontinuation from all production during the end of the 1977 model year. The mid-size B-body 1977 Dodge Monaco two-door coupe, four-door wagon and four-door sedan replaced the previous model year's Coronet hardtop coupe, four-door wagon and four-door sedan. These cars were "corporate twins" to the new-for-1975 "downsized" Plymouth Fury. The 1977 Dodge Monaco Brougham four-door sedan replaced the previous model year's Coronet Brougham four-door sedan. The 1977 Dodge Monaco Crestwood four-door wagon replaced the previous model year's Coronet Crestwood four-door wagon. However, the 1977 Dodge Monaco, for all marketing practices, were little-changed from the 1976 Coronet. The 1977 models received a revised front end design with stacked rectangular headlamps.

1978 
For the 1978 model year, the mid-size B-body 1978 Dodge Monaco was unchanged from the previous model year. It became Dodge's largest car during the 1978 model year. The Dodge Monaco was discontinued at the end of the 1978 model year. The B-Body cars continued in the form of the Dodge Magnum until 1979.

Replacement 
For 1979, the Dodge Monaco was replaced by the Dodge St. Regis, using the Chrysler R platform (a small revision of the B platform). Struggling to compete against the all-new designs of General Motors and Ford, sales of the St. Regis were heavily supported by fleets, largely including law enforcement vehicles. After 1981, the St. Regis was discontinued (in favor of the Diplomat), becoming the longest-wheelbase sedan, Chrysler had produced, until the 2005 Dodge Magnum debuted.

Production Figures:

Fifth generation (1990–1992)

For the 1990 model year, Dodge revived the Monaco nameplate after a 12-year hiatus. Replacing the long-running Diplomat sedan, the model line was the first full-size Dodge sedan since the 1981 Dodge St. Regis. Slotted above the slightly smaller Dodge Dynasty in size, the fifth-generation Monaco was the Dodge counterpart of the Eagle Premier, available in standard LE and deluxe ES trims.

The Dodge Monaco and Eagle Premier were assembled by the Bramalea Assembly in Brampton, Ontario (opened by AMC in 1986). Although produced in Canada, Chrysler Canada did not sell the model line; following the discontinuation of the Diplomat, the largest Dodge sedan sold in Canada was the mid-size Spirit (the Dynasty was badged as a Chrysler).

For 1993, Dodge consolidated its two largest sedan lines, as the Dodge Intrepid replaced both the Monaco and the Dynasty; the Eagle Vision replaced the Premier.

Background and development 
In August 1987, Chrysler completed its acquisition of American Motors Corporation (AMC). Along with its ownership of the Jeep model line, the AMC Eagle sedan/station wagons, and the Renault lineup of the Alliance and Encore (and the newly introduced Medallion), AMC was sought after for ability to develop and engineer cars quicker (and at lower cost) than other American auto manufacturers. Beginning in 1985, AMC had begun to build the Dodge Omni/Plymouth Horizon and the Dodge Diplomat/Plymouth Gran Fury/Chrysler Fifth Avenue for Chrysler under contract.

At the time of the sale, AMC was nearing the release of the Premier, a collaboration between AMC and Renault to develop a full-size car for the North American market. The largest AMC-branded vehicle since the 1978 Matador, the Premier was to become a full model line, including a four-door sedan, station wagon, and two-door coupe (named the Allure). Derived from the chassis of the Renault 25 (the flagship Renault model line in Europe), the Premier adopted the suspension of the Renault (later Eagle) Medallion (a Renault 21 developed for North America, replacing the Renault 18i and AMC Concord). To further distinguish the AMC Premier from the Renault 25, the model line received an exterior update by Giorgetto Giugiaro; the interior was restyled by AMC designer Dick Teague (one of his final designs). The standard engine was an AMC-sourced 2.5 L inline-4 (shared with Jeep) and an optional 3.0 L PRV V6. 

The Premier began production in September 1987 for the 1988 model year. While prototypes wore Renault badging, all production vehicles wore the badging of the newly created Eagle brand (though designated with AMC VINs). The flagship of the Eagle brand, the Premier was slotted above the Medallion (a nearly direct rebrand of the Renault 21) and the Eagle Wagon (the former AMC Eagle, ending production in December 1987).

Along with its purchase of AMC, Chrysler contractually agreed to use 260,000 PRV V6 engines. For 1988 and 1989, Eagle sold less than 90,000 Premiers, forcing Chrysler to shutter the Bramalea plant on several occasions. To expand production of the facility and to also fulfill its obligation to Renault sooner, Chrysler opted to offer a Dodge-branded version of the model line alongside the Premier for the 1990 model year.

Model overview

Chassis 
The Dodge Monaco and Eagle Premier use the front-wheel drive Chrysler B platform. Developed in a collaboration of AMC and Renault, the architecture was the final AMC vehicle platform and the only front-wheel drive chassis ever produced by the automaker. Originally codenamed X-58, the chassis was renamed following its acquisition by Chrysler. Sharing only its letter designation with the 1962-1979 Chrysler intermediate architecture, the 1988-1992 B platform is derived from the Renault 25, sharing the rear torsion-bar suspension design of the Renault 21.

The Dodge Monaco was fitted with four-wheel disc brakes (introduced to the Premier for 1990), with anti-lock brakes (ABS) becoming added in 1991. The first-generation Dodge Viper shares its rear disc brakes with the Dodge Monaco/Eagle Premier (without ABS).

Engineered by former Renault product engineer François Castaing, the B platform adopted a longitudinal engine configuration, allowing for better engine access and more stable handling. To increase compatibility with other Chrysler vehicles (and to increase reliability), the B platform shifted from Renault to Chrysler electrical components for 1990.

Powertrain 
The Dodge Monaco was powered by the Renault-produced 3.0 L "Douvrin" PRV V6, paired with a ZF-produced 4-speed automatic transmission

Body 
For 1990, the Eagle Premier underwent a minor revision (leading to the deletion of the Design Giugiaro badges). The Dodge Monaco shared its entire body with the Premier, differing in turn signal lenses (amber instead of clear), trunklid design (gray trim between the taillamps), and the adoption of the Dodge "crosshair" grille. 

In contrast to the Dodge Dynasty (six-passenger with a 50/50 split front bench seat and column-mount shifter), the Monaco was a five-passenger vehicle with front bucket seats and a console-mounted shifter.

For 1991, the Monaco replaced chrome trim on all models with black or body-color trim. To streamline production, air conditioning and automatic climate control became standard.

Production

See also 
Bluesmobile, a fictional car used in the 1980 film The Blues Brothers, based on a 1974 Dodge Monaco.

Bibliography
 Burness, Tad, American Car Spotter's Guide (Osceola, WI: Motorbooks International, 1978 & 1981)

References

External links

 The Dodge Monaco, www.allpar.com
 1969 - 1973 Dodge Monaco at Fuselage.de site
 1969 Dodge Monaco "Super-Lite" Ad (jpg format)

Monaco
Front-wheel-drive vehicles
Rear-wheel-drive vehicles
Police vehicles
Full-size vehicles
Mid-size cars
Convertibles
Coupés
Sedans
Station wagons
Cars introduced in 1965
1970s cars
1990s cars